Jean Stafford born January 1, 1950, is an Australian country music icon. In a career spanning more than five decades in country music, she has released multiple gold and platinum selling albums along with her early hits such as “What Kind of a Girl (Do You Think I Am)”, “Hello, Love” and “That Glory Bound Train”. 

Stafford is an Australian-born country music artist. She has received numerous awards and accolades in Australia, New Zealand, Europe and the United States.

In 1989, Stafford was officially crowned as “Australia’s Queen Of Country Music” by Smoky Dawson.

In 1991, for recognition of her important contributions to Country Music, Stafford received a ceremonial Key to the City of Nashville, awarded by the Tennessee Governor Ned McWherter, she is the only Australian to have ever received this honour. Stafford also received Honorary Tennessean citizenship, awarded in recognition of her significant and outstanding service to country music.

Stafford was the only individual female country music artist with high enough selling albums to reach two Aria nominations at the 1987 Aria Awards inauguration. Stafford has won three Golden Guitar awards and was inducted into the Country Music Awards of Australia's "Roll Of Renown" in 2008. 

Stafford was a regular on “Midday” a popular Australian television program on the Nine Network hosted by Ray Martin during the 1980s and 1990s with over 31 performances. Including her many other performances and appearances on Australian television shows such as “The Mike Walsh Show”, “The Ernie Sigley Show” and “It’s Country Today”, Stafford holds the record of the most appearing individual female country music artist on Australian television history.

Early life and career
Stafford was born in Latrobe, Tasmania on January 1, 1950. Stafford was the youngest of two daughters born to Ethal Daphne Stafford. Stafford grew up in Meander in a one-room cabin along with her mother, foster-father and six cousins.

In 1962, at the age of 12, Stafford made her first television appearance on a program called ShowTime a popular series from TNT-9 Launceston, Tasmania at that time. Stafford was the first female country artist to sing on black and white television in Launceston. After leaving school, Stafford worked at a hotel as a kitchen hand in a nearby town of Deloraine, Tasmania, while performing at local dances on weekends, she began to learn her craft as a professional singer.

Stafford's first recordings occur in 1965 at the age of 15, singing several duets with Dusty Rankin for the Hadley Recording Company.

1973-1980s
In 1973, Stafford won first prize in a Country Music Talent Quest in Launceston and received a five-album deal with Hadley Records. Stafford's debut album Flowers for Mama was recorded in Tamworth was released in 1974. It gained her Australia-wide recognition, winning her first Golden Guitar Award at the 1975 Country Music Awards of Australia with the track "What Kind of a Girl Do You Think I Am". A self-titled studio and third studio album titled, I'll Sing You a Country Song followed in 1970s.

In 1979, Stafford imprinted her hands into the Tamworth Hands of Fame. In 1979, Stafford released her fourth studio album, Hello Love, which won her a second Golden Guitar award in 1980. She won her third Female Vocalist of the Year Golden Guitar award in 1981 for the song "That Glory Bound Train", from her fifth studio album, Born Again.

In 1981 Stafford signed a three-album deal with EMI Music Australia and released The Way I Feel Inside in 1981, Someday I'll Take Home the Roses in 1982 and Burning Bright in 1986. In 1985, Stafford began appearing on the Ray Martin Midday Show.

In 1985, Stafford was asked to be part of the Australia Too campaign, recording the charity single "The Garden" for Freedom from Hunger in Ethiopia. The song peaked at number 38 on the Australian charts. At the 1986 Country Music Awards of Australia, it won Song of the Year. and at the APRA Music Awards of 1987, the song won Most Performed Australasian Country Work.

At the inaugural ARIA Music Awards in 1987, Stafford was nominated for two awards. In 1988, her first compilation album, The Golden Voice of Country was released.

In 1989, Stafford was crowned Australia's Queen of Country Music in Sydney.

1990-present 
In 1990, Stafford released the covers album, Classic Jean Stafford before heading to Nashville, Tennessee where she records for the first time, the album, That Says it All, produced by Jimmie Crawford it was released in 1991. In 1991 Mo Awards, Stafford wins Female Country Entertainer of the Year.

In 1992, Stafford is appointed Honorary Commissioner to the US by Tasmanian Government for three years, which was later extended. 

In 1993, Stafford wrote and recorded the song, "Tassie's Got It All", promoting Tasmanian tourism. The song and video are played across North America and Europe.

In 1996, Stafford is inducted into the South Australian Country Music Festival Award's Hall of Fame. 

In 1997, Stafford collaborated her vocals with Grand Ole Opry superstar Kitty Wells. The duo recorded wells’ 1952 hit "It Wasn't God Who Made Honky Tonk Angels" as a single and later released on compilation album as The Queens of Country Music.

In 1998, Stafford and wells formed an Australian tour to promote the album ending their final concert in Comet, Queensland. Wells had openly stated on a number of occasions that she believed stafford to be equal to other members at the Grand Ole Opry – the home of Country Music. Stafford credited Kitty Wells as a mentor and later forming a close friendship until wells’ death in 2012 . 

In 2004, Stafford produced her eleventh studio album “Let the Dance Begin - co-produced with Jimmie Crawford in Nashville. her first commercial release in over a decade. all songs on the album were completely composed and written by Stafford. The album “Let the Dance Begin” has won stafford many awards and accolades including Female Vocalist of the Year at the Western Country Music Awards in Fort Worth, Texas, becoming the first Australian to be nominated and win a Western Country Music Awards.

In 2008, Stafford was elevated to Australian Roll of Renown at the Country Music Awards Australia before relocating back to Tasmania in 2009.

In 2012, Stafford was inducted into the Tasmania Axemans Wall of Fame. In 2016, Stafford was the inaugural inductee in the Tasmanian Independent Country Music Awards Hall of Fame.

In 2022, Stafford performed as a part of the tasmanian songbook "Festival Of Voices" in Hobart.

Personal life

Since the early 1980s Stafford has lived in New South Wales, Australia and later the United States in Nashville, for several years as an honorary citizen of Tennessee.

In 1991 She returned to Australia and married her long time pedal steel guitarist "Wayne Appleby".

Stafford has three children to a previous earlier marriage. Both her daughters have musical talents and have collaborated as backing vocals.

Stafford now resides in Tasmania with her family near the township of Burnie.

Discography

Studio albums

Compilation albums

Singles

Other singles

Television Performances and Appearance

In 1985, Stafford began performing regularly on Midday hosted by Ray Martin on the Nine Network.

In 1993, after 14 seasons and over 31 performances, Stafford ended her final performance on “Midday”. Later that same year Martin was moved to become the host of A Current Affair.

Awards and nominations

ARIA Awards
Stafford had been nominated for 2 ARIA Music Awards

|-
| rowspan="2"| 1987 ||rowspan="2"| Burning Bright || ARIA Award for Best Country Album || 
|-
| ARIA Award for Best Female Artist || 
|-

APRA Awards

At the APRA Music Awards of 1987, Stafford was one of the vocalist in the Australian Supergroup line-up "Australia Too" the song The Garden won Most Performed Australasian Country Work. All Proceeds went to Freedom from Hunger in Ethiopia. The song peaked at number 38 on the Australian singles chart.

Country Music Awards (CMAA)
Stafford has won three Golden guitar awards at the Tamworth Country Music Awards of Australia

|-
| 1975 || "What Kind of a Girl Do You Think I Am" || Female Vocalist of the Year  || 
|-
| 1976 || "Philadelphia Lawyer" || Female Vocalist of the Year  || 
|-
| 1979 || "Good Enough To Be Your Wife" || Female Vocalist of the Year  || 
|-
| 1979 || herself || Hands of Fame || 
|-
| 1980 || Hello, Love || Female Vocalist of the Year  || 
|-
| 1981 || "That Glory Bound Train" || Female Vocalist of the Year  || 
|-
| 1982 || "Cold Winter Body" || Female Vocalist of the Year  || 
|-
| 1986 || "The Garden" by Australian Supergroup "Australia Too" || Apra Song Of The Year  || 
|-
| 2008 || herself || Roll of Renown || 
|-

Mo Awards
The Mo Awards are annual Australian entertainment industry awards. They recognise achievements in live entertainment in Australia. Stafford has won two awards.

|-
| 1990 || herself|| Female Country Entertainer of the Year|| 
|-
| 2015 || herself || Country Female Act of the Year|| 
|-

South Australian Country Music Festival Awards

|-
| 1996  || herself || Hall of Fame  || 
|-

Tasmania Axemans Wall of Fame

|-
| 2012  || herself || Wall of Fame || 
|-

Tasmanian Independent Country Music Awards
The Tasmanian Independent Country Music Awards commenced in 2016.

|-
| 2016  || herself || Hall of Fame || 
|-

Western Country Music Awards
The Western Country Music Awards commenced in 1996 at Fort Worth, Texas, recognising the performers and artisans active in the contemporary cowboy and western movement.

|-
| 2006  || Steelin' The 2 Step || Female Vocalist of the Year || 
|-

References

1950 births
Living people
Australian country singers
People from Latrobe, Tasmania
Musicians from Tasmania